Juan de Fuca (10 June 1536, Cefalonia 23 July 1602, Cefalonia) was a Greek pilot who served PhilipII of Spain. He is best known for his claim to have explored the Strait of Aniánnow known as the Strait of Juan de Fucabetween Vancouver Island (now part of British Columbia, Canada) and the Olympic Peninsula (northwestern Washington state in the United States).

Name
However, his exact name is somewhat uncertain. Some sources state that his actual name was Apostolos Valerianos. It is possible that he was baptized as Apostolos and later adopted the name Ioannis or Juan because  is not a common Spanish name. It is known that his father and grandfather bore the name Focas, so it seems likely that Valerianos was a nickname or epithet borrowed from the village where he grew up on Cefalonia.

Family and early life
De Fuca's grandfather Emmanouil Fokas fled Constantinople during its fall in 1453, accompanied by his brother Andronikos. The two settled first in the Peloponnese, where Andronikos remained, but in 1470 Emmanouil moved to the island of Cefalonia. Ioannis's father Iakovos established himself in the village of Valerianos on the island and came to be known as "the Valeriano Fokas" (Fokas ho Valerianos) to distinguish him from his brothers. De Fuca was born in Valerianos on June 10, 1536. Little is known about his life before he entered the service of Spain some time around 1555.

Early career
De Fuca's early voyages were to the Far East, and he claimed to have arrived in New Spain in 1587 when, off Cabo San Lucas in Baja California, the English privateer Thomas Cavendish seized his galleon Santa Ana and deposited him ashore. He was a well-traveled seaman, perfecting his skill as a pilot in the Spanish fleet. The King of Spain, he also claimed, recognized him for his excellence and made him pilot of the Spanish navy in the West Indies (a title he held for forty years), but there is no record in Spanish archives of his name or position or of his visit to the royal court. Before he made his famous trip up the northwest coast of the North American continent, he sailed to China, the Philippines and Mexico. The Strait of Juan de Fuca between the United States of America and Canada was named for him by British Captain Charles Barkley because it was at the same latitude that Juan de Fuca described as the location of the Strait of Anián.

Voyages to the north

According to de Fuca's account, he undertook two voyages of exploration on the orders of the Viceroy of New Spain, Luis de Velasco, marqués de Salinas, both intended to find the fabled Strait of Anián, believed to be a Northwest Passage, a sea route linking the Atlantic and Pacific Oceans.  The first voyage saw 200 soldiers and three small ships under the overall command of a Spanish captain (with de Fuca as pilot and master) assigned the task of finding the Strait of Anián and fortifying it against the English. This expedition failed when, allegedly due to the captain's malfeasance, the soldiers mutinied and returned home to California.  (Note that in this period, Spanish doctrine divided control of ships and fleets between the military commander, who was an army officer, and the sailing and navigation commander, who was a mariner.)

In 1592, on his second voyage, De Fuca enjoyed success.  Having sailed north with a caravel and a pinnace and a few armed marines, he returned to Acapulco and claimed to have found the strait, with a large island at its mouth, at around 47° north latitude. The Strait of Juan de Fuca is in fact at around 48° N, although Fuca's account of sailing into it departs from reality, describing a region far different from what actually existed there.  During the voyage, De Fuca also noted a "high pinnacle or spired rock", which may have been Fuca Pillar, a tall, almost rectangular, rock on the western shore of Cape Flattery on the northwestern tip of Washington beside the Strait of Juan de Fuca - although De Fuca noted it being on the other side of the strait.

Despite Velasco's repeated promises, however, De Fuca never received the great rewards he claimed as his due. After two years, and on the viceroy's urging, De Fuca travelled to Spain to make his case to the court in person. Disappointed again and disgusted with the Spanish, the aging Greek determined to retire to his home in Kefallonia, but was in 1596 convinced by an Englishman, Michael Lok (also spelled as Locke in English and French documents from the period), to offer his services to Spain's archenemy, Queen Elizabeth. Nothing came of Lok and De Fuca's proposals, but it is through Lok's account that the story of Juan de Fuca entered English letters.

Controversy

Because the only written evidence for De Fuca's voyages lay in Lok's account — researchers being unable to find records of the expedition in Spanish colonial archives — there was long much controversy over his discovery and, indeed, whether he had ever even existed as a real person;  several scholars have dismissed Juan de Fuca as entirely fictitious, and the 18th-century British explorer Captain Cook strongly doubted that the strait De Fuca claimed to have discovered even existed (although Cook actually sailed past the Strait of Juan de Fuca without entering it and did stop at Nootka Sound on the west coast of Vancouver Island). With later English exploration and settlement of the area, however, Du Fuca's claims seemed much more credible.

Finally, in 1859, an American researcher, with the help of the U.S. Consul in the Ionian Islands, was able to demonstrate not only that De Fuca had lived but also that his family and history were well known on the islands.  While we may never know the exact truths that lay behind the account published by Lok, it must be considered unlikely that the man himself was fictional.

Legacy
When the English captain Charles William Barkley, sailing the Imperial Eagle in 1787, (re)discovered the strait De Fuca had described, he renamed it the Strait of Juan de Fuca.

The Juan de Fuca Ridge and the Juan de Fuca Plate, a tectonic plate underlying much of the coastline he explored, is named for the Strait of Juan de Fuca.

Juan de Fuca Provincial Park on Vancouver Island's West Coast is named for the strait, as is the hiking trail of the same name.

See also
 Phokas (Byzantine family)

References

Further reading 

A note made by me, Michael Lok the Elder, touching the strait of sea commonly called Fretum Anian, in the South Sea, through the northwest passage of Meta Incognita, in Samuel Purchas, Pilgrims, London, 1625, Vol III, page 849
 Memoir, Historical and Political, on the Northwest Coast of North America, Robert Greenhow, 1840, P 174
Memorials of Juan de Fuca, A. S. Taylor, in Hutchings' California Magazine, Sep.-Oct. 1859, pp116-122, 161-167
British Columbia: From the Earliest Times to the Present, Chapter II, The Apocryphal Voyages, pp. 19-31, Ethelbert Olaf Stuart Scholefield, publ. S.J. Clarke, Vancouver, 1914
 "Ioannis Apostolos Focas Valerianos (Juan de Fuca). The Kefallonian adventurer of the 16th c.", by Evridiki Livada Duca, Kefallonia 2001, published by the Municipality of Elios - Pronnoi.
 "The Straits of Chimera", by Evridiki Livada Duca, New York 2014, published by the FEDERATION OF CEPHALONIAN AND ITHACIAN SOCIETIES and presented in Queens College (CUNY), and Rutgers University in October and November 2014. (In English and in Greek as: "Στα Στενά της Χίμαιρας", Ευρυδίκη Λειβαδά Ντούκα, Αθήνα 2007, Έκδοση: ΚΕΔΡΟΣ. Spanish translation by Pedro Olalla ("El Paso de la Quimera", 2017) for the Ouranis Foundation, unpublished)

1536 births
1602 deaths
People from Cephalonia
16th-century Venetian people
Spanish explorers
Explorers of North America 
Explorers of British Columbia
16th-century Greek people
Greek explorers
Venetian Greeks
17th-century Venetian people
Strait of Juan de Fuca